Injustice is a five-part British drama television series about criminal defence barrister William Travers, who has lost faith in the legal system following a traumatic series of events. The one-hour drama premiered on 6 June 2011 on ITV. The series was released on DVD on 13 June 2011 via Acorn Media UK.

Plot
Barrister Will Travers (James Purefoy), his wife, Jane (Dervla Kirwan), who teaches at a Young Offenders' Centre, and their younger daughter live in the Suffolk countryside. Natalie Chandra (Sasha Behar), a London solicitor, asks Will to defend Martin Newall (Nathaniel Parker), an old friend, accused of murdering his secretary and lover but protesting his innocence. Jane is not happy when Will takes the brief on as they had left London years earlier after his last murder case, with Jane leaving behind a successful career as a publisher.

The killing of a reclusive farm worker, John Jarrold, takes place near to the Travers' home, and the investigation is led by the hard-nosed D.I. Wenborn (Charlie Creed-Miles), who strongly dislikes Will after the barrister showed that one of his men lied in court to get a false conviction.

Cast
 James Purefoy as William "Will" Travers
 Charlie Creed-Miles as DI Mark Wenborn
 Dervla Kirwan as Jane Travers
 Robert Whitelock as Philip Spaull
 Lisa Diveney as Kate Travers
 Nathaniel Parker as Martin Newall
 Jayne Wisener as Lucy Wilson
 Sasha Behar as Natalie Chandra

Episode list

Reception
Catherine Gee of The Telegraph called Injustice a "nicely complex and multi-layered drama – even if it does resort to the occasional cliché."

References

External links
 

2010s British drama television series
2010s British legal television series
2011 British television series debuts
2011 British television series endings
2010s British television miniseries
English-language television shows
ITV television dramas
Television shows written by Anthony Horowitz
Television shows set in Suffolk